According to the Jargon File, smoking clover is a computer display hack, originally created by Bill Gosper. Several converging lines are drawn on a color monitor in such a way that every pixel struck has its color incremented—altered to the next hue up or down. The color map is then repeatedly rotated.

The result of this is a rainbow-hued, shimmering four-leaf clover. The program has been described as "psychedelic", and Gosper joked about keeping it a secret from the Food and Drug Administration (FDA) due to its "hallucinogenic properties".

Source code for Linux to reproduce the effect is available on the web.

Notes 

Psychedelia
Novelty software